Futbolo klubas Žalgiris, commonly known as FK Žalgiris, Žalgiris Vilnius or simply Žalgiris, is a Lithuanian professional football club based in Vilnius. The club competes in the A Lyga, the top flight of Lithuanian football. The club was founded as Dinamo in 1947. The club's name commemorates the victorious Battle of Žalgiris (Battle of Grunwald) (both names: Žalgiris and Grunwald are translated as "green forest"). Žalgiris has featured many Lithuanian football legends during its history, including Arminas Narbekovas, Valdas Ivanauskas, Edgaras Jankauskas and Deividas Šemberas. They have won the Lithuanian Championship 10 times, the Lithuanian Football Cup 14 times and the Lithuanian Supercup 7 times.

The team's colours are green and white. The club plays at LFF stadium in Vilnius which has a capacity of 5,067.

After beating Malmö in the second round of Champions League qualifying in July 2022, Žalgiris secured themselves group stage football and became the first ever Lithuanian club to qualify for the group stages of a UEFA club competition; where they dropped into the Conference League group stage after losing in the Europa League play-offs. They would finish bottom of their group with five points, and one win from their six games.

History

Foundation and Soviet period
The first incarnation of the club played in 1946 as a national team of Lithuanian Soviet Socialist Republic when it competed in USSR Group III Zone 4 championship and it was one of the clubs which represented one of the Soviet republics. The club consisted of Spartakas Kaunas and Dinamo Kaunas players. Their first match was against Stroitel Moscow which ended 1–1 and they were managed by French coach Emil Pastor. That year they finished in fourth place in RSFSR Western Zone championship.

The club is thought to have been founded in 1947 when it was moved from Kaunas to Vilnius and its name was changed to Dinamo Vilnius. First official match of the formed club was played on 16 May 1947 against Lokomotiv Moscow, who managed to defeat local team 1–2. Steponas Petraitis scored the first official goal for the club that day, beating goalkeeper from a penalty spot in 44th minute. The next year club changed its name to Spartakas Vilnius and used this name until the end of 1961 season. In 1962, they changed their name to Žalgiris.

Žalgiris competed in Soviet Union football league system from 1947 to 1989. Team achieved its first promotion to the top tier in 1952, but came last next season.

Before the start of the 1983 season in Soviet Top League, players initiative group demanded the resignation of coach Benjaminas Zelkevičius, and the players wish was granted as, Algimantas Liubinskas became the trainer.
Start was cautious. A similar result 0–0 has played in Tashkent with Pakhtakor, in Leningrad with Zenit, in Vilnius with Dynamo. In the fourth match of the season against Neftchi in Baku, Gražulis scored goal on 1–0 and brought victory. There were victories and failures, but Žalgiris became the winners of the first round. In first place Žalgiris stayed short, Nevertheless, final fifth place is the highest achievement of Lithuanian football on this time and gives a great hope for future. Arminas Narbekovas, Romas Mažeikis, and Vladimiras Buzmakovas succeeded in the team in that season.

In 1984 Soviet Top League season, Žalgiris finished on 9 place among 18 teams, but rejoiced victories against FC Dynamo Kyiv (1–0 at home), FC Spartak Moscow (twice 2–1), FC Dynamo Moscow (1–0 at home, 2–1 in Moscow). and Valdas Ivanauskas debuted in first team.

The club's most successful season was in 1987 when they finished third in the Soviet Top League and qualified for 1988–89 UEFA Cup where they played against Austria Wien, while also for the first time in club's history reaching semi–finals of the 1987–88 Soviet Cup (after being eliminated in quarter-finals of the 1955, 1959–60, 1964 campaigns) and 1987 USSR Federation Cup. The club represented the Soviet Union at 1987 Summer Universiade which they won by defeating the South Korean team. In the following season they finished fifth and again qualified for UEFA Cup where they faced IFK Göteborg in the first round and Red Star Belgrade in the second. In 1988, several of Žalgiris players were decorated with medals in the USSR national teams: Vyacheslav Sukristov received silver medal of the UEFA Euro 1988, and Arminas Narbekovas and Arvydas Janonis brought back gold medals from the 1988 Summer Olympics. In 1989 the club finished in fourth place and for the third year in a row qualified for UEFA Cup. They managed to play one game in 1990 at the start of the season before withdrawing due to re-establishment of Lithuania's independence and joined the Baltic League which consisted of clubs from Lithuania, Latvia and Estonia. Therefore, they lost their place in UEFA Cup, which was taken by Chornomorets Odesa.

1990–2007
Following Lithuania's declaration of independence on 11 March 1990, Žalgiris left Soviet Top League with immediate effect. Despite most of the top players including Arminas Narbekovas, Valdas Ivanauskas, Igoris Pankratjevas, Vyacheslav Sukristov and Robertas Fridrikas leaving the club Žalgiris remained favorites to clinch the Lithuanian title and won A Lyga regular season having lost just once in 32 games. The championship, however, was decided by the knock-out competition where Žalgiris lost in the semi-finals to Ekranas Panevėžys and only managed to take a third place.

Green and whites took their first A Lyga title the following season when they won the regular season, took the revenge against Ekranas beating them in the semi-finals and won the final against Lietuvos Makabi Vilnius 3–1 with Ričardas Zdančius scoring a hat-trick. Žalgiris completed the double later that year by winning the Lithuanian cup.

The 1991 season was followed by two significant changes in league format: the knock-out competition was removed and league was reorganized to be played from autumn until spring. Žalgiris saw off the challenge from Panerys Vilnius to defend their title by a single point. There were no double in this year, however: Lietuvos Makabi took revenge for their defeat in last season's league final and beat Žalgiris in the final 1–0. In the summer of 1992, Žalgiris made their debut in the UEFA Champions League. Europe's elite proved to be merciless: PSV Eindhoven hammered Žalgiris 8–0 on aggregate in the first round.

In 1992–93 season things went the other way round in national competitions: having lost the national title to FK Ekranas by three points Žalgiris reclaimed the cup, beating Sirijus Klaipėda 1–0 in the final courtesy of the extra-time goal by Aurelijus Skarbalius. A similar story happened in the 1993–94 season when ROMAR Mažeikiai narrowly beat Vilnius' side to the title while Žalgiris defended the cup by beating FK Ekranas 4–2 in the final. Darius Maciulevičius was the hero of that day scoring a hat-trick and Aidas Preikšaitis added another from the penalty spot.

1994–95 season delivered a double blow for the side from the capital. Žalgiris and Inkaras Kaunas finished the league locked on points at the top and extra match on neutral ground was set to be played. Inkaras Kaunas beat Žalgiris 2–0 in Panevėžys and four days later the same two teams met in Klaipėda for cup final. Inkaras once again came out better off as former Žalgiris man Eimantas Poderis scored twice in a 2–1 victory for Kaunas' side. 1995–96 season did not bring silverware either: free scoring Žalgiris side racked up 106 goals in just 28 games in the league yet could only take a third place, six points behind champions Inkaras Kaunas. On this time Edgaras Jankauskas was top scorer A Lyga with 25 goals. He was later sold to CSKA Moscow.

Things did not go well in the cup as well as Vilnius' side lost to Kareda Šiauliai in the semi-finals and failed to advance to the final for the first time in six years. Žalgiris reclaimed the cup in 1996–97 season as Donatas Vencevičius' penalty was enough to see off Inkaras in the final but had to settle for second in the league as Kareda coasted to the title with an 8-point margin. Green and whites mounted a stronger challenge in 1997–98 yet Kareda proved its success has been no fluke by defending their title.

The elusive title finally came in 1998–99 season, the last one to be played from autumn until spring. Defense was the key to success as Žalgiris conceded just 8 goals in 23 games and did not lose a single league match that season. Things were different in the cup as Kareda dismantled Žalgiris 7–0 on aggregate in the semi-finals. The league title allowed Žalgiris to have another try in the UEFA Champions League and this time Vilnius' side eliminated Armenian champions Araks Ararat before succumbing to a defeat to last season's semi-finalists Dynamo Kyiv in the second round.

With a turn of the century a new force rose in Lithuanian football: FBK Kaunas. Under the name of Žalgiris Kaunas they won the transitional shortened league season in 1999 and then backed it up by consecutive titles in 2000, 2001, 2002, 2003 and 2004. Žalgiris on the other hand went into decline and cup final win in 2003 proved to be the sole piece of silverware for the club in the 2000s. In the league Žalgiris started to struggle as well. While in 1999 and 2000 green and whites finished second, 2001 saw them dropping to third, 2002 to fourth and 2005 to the recently unimaginable lows of eighth. Žalgiris was not even the strongest team in the capital as newcomers Vėtra and FC Vilnius were clearly having better time on the pitch.

Despite a constant presence in European competitions the results there were rarely encouraging with the aggregate defeats like 2–7 to Ruch Chorzow and 0–7 to Maccabi Tel Aviv. Budapest Honved and Portadown were the only teams eliminated by Žalgiris between 2000 and 2004. 2005 UEFA Intertoto Cup thus stood out as a major success as green and whites went past three teams – Lisburn Distillery, Dinaburg and Egaleo, before being eliminated by CFR Cluj.

2008–present
The struggles of the noughties culminated in 2008. The league finish of fifth could have been seen as adequate for the time (20 points gap to fourth-placed Sūduva was harder to take) but as country's economy braced for the inevitable crisis, expenditures were cut and uncertainty rose Žalgiris was dealt a big blow when club owner Vadim Kastujev was arrested in Moscow. Striped of funds club survived until the end of the season but failed to meet licensing requirements for top flight competition in 2009. With old club's future very much in doubt fans of Žalgiris founded a new phoenix club called VMFD Žalgiris which had the same players and staff, and following unsuccessful application for A Lyga license entered second division.

A year outside of top flight proved to be difficult. Žalgiris finished sixth in seven team league and were eliminated from the cup in the Round of 16 by Sakuona Plikiai, a team from a town with a population of just 600. Despite this bleak performance the club received promotion to A Lyga as the number of teams in top flight was increased and some other clubs refused to join in mainly because of financial burden. Žalgiris finished 2010 season in the third place, their highest since 2001.

The fortunes of Žalgiris went all uphill from there. With FBK Kaunas in complete turmoil and Vėtra bankrupt Ekranas for several years became the undisputed superpower of Lithuanian football. Green and whites were closing in, however: Žalgiris took second in 2011, eight points adrift, and closed the gap to a single point a year later. Moreover, in 2012 Vilnius side finally ended their nine-year trophy drought and won Lithuanian Football Cup, beating Ekranas on penalties following a 0–0 draw. The same season saw Žalgiris returning to European competitions but their UEFA Europa League campaign proved to be short: following 1–1 draw in Vilnius, Admira Wacker Mödling hammered Žalgiris 5–1 in the second leg of the second qualifying round.

Žalgiris were considered to be strong favorites for the title before the 2013 season and for much of the season it looked that they would cruise to the championship. Žalgiris had eleven points lead over second-placed Atlantas with five games remaining but four draws in the row followed and before the final match of the season the gap at the top was reduced to three points. In final match out of form Žalgiris proved to be no match for Sūduva and for much of the day prospect of season decider on neutral venue looked very likely. However, in tense atmosphere it was Atlantas who ultimately let it slip as they could only draw the game with Banga Gargždai and Žalgiris celebrated their first title in fourteen years. Victory in Cup final against Šiauliai meant that the double was won—the first since 1991. The great year was backed up by successful performance in UEFA Europa League where Vilnius' side eliminated St. Patrick's Athletic, Pyunik Yerevan and Lech Poznan before losing out to Red Bull Salzburg.

Defending the title in 2014 proved to be far more routine task. Žalgiris finished the season 18 points clear of second-placed Kruoja Pakruojis (the largest winning margin in the league since 2006) and also claimed the cup for the third time in the row, beating Banga Gargždai 2–1 in the final. The club made return to UEFA Champions League after fourteen-year absence yet it did not bring much joy as Dinamo Zagreb beat Žalgiris 4–0 on aggregate in the second qualifying round.

In May 2015 Žalgiris won Lithuanian cup for a record fourth time in the row, beating Atlantas 2–0 in the final. UEFA Champions League campaign was again limited to just two games as Malmo won the return leg in Vilnius 1–0 after goalless first match in Sweden. Žalgiris finished the season top of the league, ten points clear of second-placed Trakai thus claiming third successive title.

In the 2016 season, Žalgiris continued its dominance in Lithuanian football in 2016 with fourth consecutive league title and, remarkably, two cup wins. LFF Cup was rescheduled to be played from spring until autumn that year and therefore two editions of the cup have been played that year. Žalgiris won the first final in May with 1–0 extra time win over Trakai and backed it up with 2–0 final win over Sūduva in September. European experience proved to heartbreaking as following a goalless draw in the first leg in Vilnius Žalgiris was a whisker away from eliminating Astana only to concede an injury time goal to lose the game 2–1.

In the 2017 season, Žalgiris failed to progress beyond the Champions League's second qualifying round once again in 2017 when impressive first leg win over Ludogorets Razgrad and an early goal by Serge Nyuiadzi in the second leg were completely undone by four straight goals by Bulgarian side. In September 2017, Žalgiris reached the seventh consecutive cup final, where they lost to Stumbras, who appeared in their first major final. Žalgiris failed to defend the league title, while they were in top position of the standings until October 2017, but a late march by Sūduva saw them winning their first-ever championship.

In the 2018 season, Žalgiris finished in second place as Sūduva defended their league title, while Žalgiris managed to win the cup in a repeat of last year's final as they defeated Stumbras. Playing in the UEFA Europa League, Žalgiris reached the third qualifying round where they lost to Spain's Sevilla, which was their best performance in European competition since 2013 when they reached the play-off round of the qualification in the UEFA Europa League.

In November 2018, Žalgiris announced that Deividas Česnauskis and Deividas Šemberas joined the club. Česnauskis was appointed as sports director, while Šemberas – director of sports operations.

During the 2019 preseason head coach Valdas Urbonas signed contract with the Lithuanian Football Federation and became the head coach of Lithuania national team. Žalgiris then appointed Marek Zub, who was previously successfully working in the club, as head coach. However, on 15 July 2019 Zub left Žalgiris. João Luís Martins, who became available after the dissolution of FC Stumbras, took on the job of head coach on a temporary basis until the end of the season.

In January 2020, Žalgiris announced the appointment of Juan Ferrando as head coach. However, Ferrando was forced to pull out due to health issues. Later that month, Alyaksey Baha was signed as the team's new head coach. He started off with a success by winning the Lithuanian Supercup on 29 February against champions FK Sūduva. Žalgiris went on to win the 2020 A Lyga.

In July 2022, after beating Malmö 3–0 on aggregate in the Champions League second qualifying round, Žalgiris made history by guaranteeing themselves group stage football for the season. They played Ludogorets in the play-off of the Europa League, but lost on aggregate and dropped into the Conference League group stage. They were the first ever Lithuanian club to qualify for the group stages of a UEFA club competition.

Žalgiris were subsequently drawn into Group H against the Swiss stalwarts Basel, Slovakian champions Slovan Bratislava and Armenian champions Pyunik. The team would finish bottom of the group with 5 points from their 6 matches.

Name history

Stadium

For the majority of the time Žalgiris played in Žalgiris Stadium. This stadium was the biggest in Lithuania and had a capacity of 15,029.

Since 2011 Žalgiris plays in LFF Stadium (Lithuanian Football Federation stadium). This arena, formerly known as Vėtra Stadium, was built in 2004 and holds around 5,000 people.

After the bankruptcy of FK Vėtra football club, LFF took control of the stadium.

It is situated near Vilnius Old Town, 400 metres up the Aušros vartų and Liepkalnio streets from the Gate of Dawn (Lithuanian: Aušros vartai)

Supporters

The official club of Žalgiris' fans is named Pietų IV. The members of Pietų IV support the team during every game in Lithuania and in Europe and never leave the team alone. This community is united by their love and loyalty to Žalgiris. Pietų IV is the leader of organised supporting in Baltic states.

The establishment date of Pietų IV is considered October 1985. Since that time fans have been supporting the team while singing, waving flags and creating impressive choreography. Fans helped Žalgiris to survive the financial crisis. During hard periods they organized various events and collected enough money to remain. Pietų IV and the managers of the club together are the founders of Žalgiris Vilnius.

Žalgiris supporters maintain friendly relations with fans of Atlantas. Internationally, there are close historical ties with supporters of Dynamo Kyiv, Karpaty Lviv and Dinamo Tbilisi.

Kit
From the establishment of the club, Žalgiris colours were blue, red or sometimes orange. In the 1980s green and white kits were introduced, establishing green/white tradition. From then on, the kit is usually a green and white striped jersey and green/white variation of shorts and socks. In the past there have also been checkered green-white jersey designs. Away kits are usually plain white or green.

Kit manufacturers and shirt sponsors

Sponsors

Club crest

Players

Current squad

Out on loan

Žalgiris B

Staff

Participation in Lithuanian championships

 1990 Lithuanian football championship – 3rd
 1991 Lithuanian football championship – 1st
 1991–92 LFF Lyga – 1st
 1992–93 LFF Lyga – 2nd
 1993–94 LFF Lyga – 2nd
 1994–95 LFF Lyga – 2nd
 1995–96 LFF Lyga – 3rd
 1996–97 LFF Lyga – 2nd
 1997–98 LFF Lyga – 2nd
 1998–99 LFF Lyga – 1st
 1999 A Lyga – 2nd
 2000 A Lyga – 2nd
 2001 A Lyga – 3rd
 2002 A Lyga – 4th
 2003 A Lyga – 4th
 2004 A Lyga – 4th
 2005 A Lyga – 8th
 2006 A Lyga – 4th
 2007 A Lyga – 4th
 2008 A Lyga – 5th
 2009 I Lyga – 6th
 2010 A Lyga – 3rd
 2011 A Lyga – 2nd
 2012 A Lyga – 2nd
 2013 A Lyga – 1st
 2014 A Lyga – 1st
 2015 A Lyga – 1st
 2016 A Lyga – 1st
 2017 A Lyga – 2nd
 2018 A Lyga – 2nd
 2019 A Lyga – 2nd
 2020 A Lyga – 1st
 2021 A Lyga – 1st
 2022 A Lyga – 1st

UEFA coefficient

Correct as of 2 February 2021.

Participation in European cups

Overall record

Legend: GF = Goals For. GA = Goals Against. GD = Goal Difference.

Match list

Honours

Domestic
 Lithuanian Championship:
Champions – 10
1991, 1991–92, 1998–99, 2013, 2014, 2015, 2016, 2020, 2021, 2022
Runners-up – 12
1992–93, 1993–94, 1994–95, 1996–97, 1997–98, 1999, 2000, 2011, 2012, 2017, 2018, 2019
3rd place – 4
1990, 1995–96, 2001, 2010

Lithuanian Cup:
Winners – 14
1991, 1992–93, 1993–94, 1996–97, 2003, 2011–12, 2012–13, 2013–14, 2014–15, 2015–16, 2016, 2018, 2021, 2022
Finalists – 6
1990, 1992, 1995, 2000, 2001, 2017

Lithuanian Super Cup:
Winners – 8
2003, 2013, 2014, 2015, 2016, 2017, 2020, 2023

 Soviet Championship:

Soviet Top League:
3rd place – 1
1987

Soviet First League: 
Champions – 1
1982
Runners-up – 3
1952, 1954, 1966
3rd place – 1
1950

Soviet Second League:
Runners-up – 1
1977

International
Baltic League:
Champions – 1
1990

Summer Universiade:
Champions – 1
1987

Intertoto Cup:
Semi-finalists – 1
2005

Individual awards

Domestic
Lithuanian Footballer of the Year

 1965 –  Petras Glodenis
 1966 –  Gintautas Kalėdinskas
 1967 –  Stanislovas Ramelis
 1968 –  Stanislovas Ramelis
 1969 –  Juzefas Jurgelevičius
 1970 –  Romualdas Juška
 1971 –  Benjaminas Zelkevičius
 1972 –  Benjaminas Zelkevičius
 1973 –  Petras Glodenis
 1974 –  Algirdas Žilinskas
 1975 –  Vytautas Dirmeikis
 1976 –  Eugenijus Riabovas
 1977 –  Eugenijus Riabovas
 1978 –  Eugenijus Riabovas
 1979 –  Stanislovas Danisevičius
 1980 –  Juzefas Jurgelevičius
 1981 –  Vytautas Dirmeikis
 1982 –  Sigitas Jakubauskas
 1983 –  Valdas Kasparavičius
 1984 –  Stanislovas Danisevičius
 1988 – / Arminas Narbekovas
 1989 – / Valdemaras Martinkėnas
 2022 –  Edvinas Gertmonas

A Lyga Player of the Year

 1992 –  Virginijus Baltušnikas
 1994 –  Aurelijus Skarbalius
 2014 –  Deividas Šemberas
 2016 –  Mantas Kuklys
 2020 –  Saulius Mikoliūnas
 2021 –  Hugo Vidémont

A Lyga Golden Boot

 1994–95 –  Eimantas Poderis – 24
 1995–96 –  Edgaras Jankauskas – 25
 1999 –  Nerijus Vasiliauskas – 10
 2010 –  Deivydas Matulevičius – 19
 2016 –  Andrija Kaluđerović – 20
 2017 –  Darvydas Šernas – 18
 2018 –  Liviu Antal – 23
 2019 –  Tomislav Kiš – 25
 2020 –  Hugo Vidémont – 13
 2021 –  Hugo Vidémont – 17
 2022 –  Renan Oliveira – 17

International
UEFA's Golden Player
  Arminas Narbekovas

Žalgiris players in International tournaments

Žalgiris Player of the Year
Lists of the winners of Žalgiris Player of the Year Award instituted from 2004 as voted by the official members of Žalgiris supporters club – Pietų IV:

Notable players
FK Žalgiris players who have either appeared for their respective national team at any time or received an individual award while at the club. Players whose name is listed in bold represented their countries while playing for Žalgiris.

Lithuania
 Vidas Alunderis
 Nerijus Astrauskas
/ Virginijus Baltušnikas
 Stasys Baranauskas
 Dominykas Barauskas
 Rolandas Baravykas
 Giedrius Barevičius
 Džiugas Bartkus
 Markas Beneta
 Marius Bezykornovas
 Algimantas Briaunys
 Rolandas Džiaukštas
 Tautvydas Eliošius
 Georgas Freidgeimas
 Mantas Fridrikas
/ Robertas Fridrikas
 Andrius Gedgaudas
 Edvinas Gertmonas
 Šenderis Giršovičius
 Tadas Gražiūnas
/ Valdas Ivanauskas
 Sigitas Jakubauskas
 Algis Jankauskas
 Edgaras Jankauskas
/ Arvydas Janonis
 Karolis Jasaitis
 Artūras Jeršovas
 Andrius Jokšas
 Egidijus Juška
/ Romualdas Juška
 Žydrūnas Karčemarskas
 Mindaugas Kalonas
 Vytautas Karvelis
 Donatas Kazlauskas
 Saulius Klevinskas
 Linas Klimavičius
 Mantas Kuklys

 Algirdas Kulikauskas
/ Gintaras Kvitkauskas
 Tadas Labukas
/ Kęstutis Latoža
 Justas Lasickas
 Pavelas Leusas
 Vytautas Lukša
 Darius Maciulevičius
 Mindaugas Malinauskas
/ Valdemaras Martinkėnas
 Deivydas Matulevičius
/ Romas Mažeikis
 Darius Miceika
 Saulius Mikoliūnas
 Tomas Mikuckis
 Gražvydas Mikulėnas
 Valerijus Mižigurskis
 Igoris Morinas
/ Arminas Narbekovas
 Sergejus Novikovas
 Viktoras Olšanskis
/ Igoris Pankratjevas
 Vadimas Petrenko
 Linas Pilibaitis
 Eimantas Poderis
 Robertas Poškus
 Aidas Preikšaitis
 Arūnas Pukelevičius
 Andrius Puotkalis
 Ramūnas Radavičius
 Nerijus Radžius
 Tomas Ražanauskas
 Robertas Ringys
 Daniel Romanovskij
 'Kęstutis Ruzgys
 Darius Sanajevas
 Dainius Saulėnas

 Aurelijus Skarbalius
 Andrius Skerla
 Simonas Stankevičius
/ Gintaras Staučė
 Artūras Steško
 Igoris Steško
 Ramūnas Stonkus
/ Vyacheslav Sukristov
 Deividas Šemberas
 Darvydas Šernas
 Ernestas Šetkus
 Vaidotas Šilėnas
 Domantas Šimkus
 Dainius Šuliauskas
 Andrėjus Tereškinas
 Valdas Urbonas
 Simonas Urbys
 Karolis Uzėla
 Raimondas Vainoras
 Egidijus Vaitkūnas
 Nerijus Valskis
 Nerijus Vasiliauskas
 Andrius Velička
 Donatas Vencevičius
 Ovidijus Verbickas
 Raimondas Vilėniškis
 Armantas Vitkauskas
 Modestas Vorobjovas
 Ričardas Zdančius
/ Benjaminas Zelkevičius
 Irmantas Zelmikas
 Marius Žaliūkas
 Tomas Žiukas
 Artūras Žulpa
 Audrius Žuta
 Darius Žutautas
 Tomas Žvirgždauskas

Africa
 Mahamane Traoré
 Ogenyi Onazi
 Djibril Diaw
 Mamadou Mbodj
 Serge Nyuiadzi

Americas
 Renan Oliveira

European Union
 Mario Grgurović
 Tomislav Kiš
 Andro Švrljuga
 David N'Gog
 Hugo Vidémont
 Ēriks Pelcis
 Kamil Biliński
 Jakub Wilk
 Liviu Antal
 Calum Elliot
 Tomáš Malec
 Jakub Sylvestr

Non-EU
 Artak Yedigaryan
 Yury Kendysh
 Semir Kerla
 Erton Fejzullahu
 Iulian Bursuc
 Pavel Komolov
 Andrey Nagumanov
 Andrija Kaluđerović

Managerial history

 Voldemaras Jaškevičius (1947)
 Jaroslavas Citavičius (1947–1948)
 Georgy Glazkov (1948–1951)
 Andrey Protasov (1951)
 Jurij Chodotov (1952–1953)
 Stasys Paberžis (1953–1957)
 Vytautas Saunoris (1958–1960)
 Zenonas Ganusauskas (1961–1962)
 Serafim Kholodkov (1963–1965)
 Juozas Vaškelis (1966–1967)
 Algirdas Vosylius (1968–1971)
 Serafim Kholodkov (1971–1973)
 Algirdas Klimkevičius (1974–1976)
 Benjaminas Zelkevičius (1 Jan 1977 – 1 May 1983)
 Algimantas Liubinskas (1 Jan 1983 – 31 Dec 1985)
/ Benjaminas Zelkevičius (1 April 1985 – 1 Oct 1991)
 Vytautas Jančiauskas (1991–92)
 Benjaminas Zelkevičius (1 Oct 1992 – 30 June 1995)
 Eugenijus Riabovas (1996–2001)
 Kęstutis Latoža (2002)
 Eugenijus Riabovas (2003–2004)
 Kęstutis Latoža (2004–2005)
 Saulius Širmelis (2005)
 Arminas Narbekovas (30 Nov 2005 – 30 Nov 2006)
 Igoris Pankratjevas (2006)
 Viatscheslav Mogilniy (2008)
 Mindaugas Čepas (2008–2009)
 Igoris Pankratjevas (1 Jul 2009 – 31 Dec 2010)
 Vitalijus Stankevičius (1 Jan 2011 – 31 Dec 2011)
 Damir Petravić (4 Jan 2012 – 8 Aug 2012)
 Marek Zub (8 Aug 2012 – Dec 2014)
 Valdas Dambrauskas (17 Dec 2014 – 23 Oct 2017)
 Aleksandr Brazevich (24 Oct 2017 – 24 Nov 2017)
 Aurelijus Skarbalius (27 Nov 2017 – 22 Jun 2018)
 Valdas Urbonas (23 Jun 2018 – 2 Feb 2019)
 Marek Zub (13 Feb 2019 – 15 July 2019)
 João Luís Martins (15 July 2019 – 27 November 2019)
 Alyaksey Baha (19 January 2020 – 21 December 2020)
 Vladimir Cheburin (11 January 2021 – )

References

External links
  

 
Football clubs in Lithuania
Football clubs in Vilnius
FK Žalgiris Vilnius
1947 establishments in Lithuania
Soviet Top League clubs
Sport in Vilnius
Phoenix clubs (association football)